Ivanishchi is a rural locality (a settlement) in Posyolok Ivanishchi, Gus-Khrustalny District, Vladimir Oblast, Russia. The population was 1,945 as of 2010. There are 24 streets.

Geography 
Ivanishchi is located 49 km northwest of Gus-Khrustalny (the district's administrative centre) by road. Neklyudovo is the nearest rural locality.

References 

Rural localities in Gus-Khrustalny District
Sudogodsky Uyezd